Pétursson is a surname of Icelandic origin, meaning son of Pétur (Peter). In Icelandic names, the name is not strictly a surname, but a patronymic. The name refers to:

Guðmundur Pétursson (born 1986), Icelandic football player
Gunnar Pétursson (born 1930), Icelandic Olympic cross-country skier
Hallgrímur Pétursson (1614–1674), Icelandic pastor and poet
Jóhann K. Pétursson (1913–1984), Icelandic performer known as “The Viking Giant”
Jón Pétursson (1936–2003), Icelandic high jumper
Margeir Pétursson (born 1960), Icelandic banker and chess grandmaster
Oddur Pétursson (1931–2018), Icelandic Olympic cross-country skier
Pétur Pétursson (born 1959), Icelandic professional football player
Philip Petursson (1902–1988), Canadian politician from Manitoba; provincial legislator 1966–77

Icelandic-language surnames